The PR3 men's coxless pair competition at the 2019 World Rowing Championships took place at the Linz-Ottensheim regatta venue.

Schedule
The schedule was as follows:

All times are Central European Summer Time (UTC+2)

Results

Heats
Heat winners advanced directly to the final. The remaining boats were sent to the repechage.

Heat 1

Heat 2

Repechage
The four fastest boats advanced to the final. The remaining boat took no further part in the competition.

Final
The final determined the rankings.

References

2019 World Rowing Championships